William McGuire Bryson  (born 8 December 1951) is an American–British journalist and author. Bryson has written a number of nonfiction books on topics including travel, the English language, and science. Born in the United States, he has been a resident of Britain for most of his adult life, returning to the U.S. between 1995 and 2003, and holds dual American and British citizenship. He served as the chancellor of Durham University from 2005 to 2011.

Bryson came to prominence in the United Kingdom with the publication and accompanying television series of Notes from a Small Island (1995), an exploration of Britain. He received widespread recognition again with the publication of A Short History of Nearly Everything (2003), a book widely acclaimed for its accessible communication of science. In October 2020 he announced that he had "retired" from writing books, although in 2022 he recorded an audiobook for Audible, entitled 'The Secret History of Christmas'. He has sold over 16 million books worldwide.

Early life 
Bryson was born and raised in Des Moines, Iowa, the son of Bill Bryson Sr., a sports journalist who worked for 50 years at the Des Moines Register, and Agnes Mary (née McGuire), the home furnishings editor at the same newspaper. His mother was of Irish descent. He had an older brother, Michael (1942–2012), and a sister, Mary Jane Elizabeth. In 2006, Bryson published The Life and Times of the Thunderbolt Kid, a humorous account of his childhood years in Des Moines. In 2006 Frank Cownie, the mayor of Des Moines awarded Bryson the key to the city and announced that 21 October 2006 would be "Bill Bryson, The Thunderbolt Kid, Day."

Bryson attended Drake University for two years before dropping out in 1972, deciding instead to backpack around Europe for four months. He returned to Europe the following year with a high school friend, Matt Angerer (the pseudonymous Stephen Katz). Bryson wrote about some of his experiences from the trip in his book Neither Here nor There: Travels in Europe.

Move to the United Kingdom

Bryson first visited Britain in 1973 during his tour of Europe and decided to stay after landing a job working in a psychiatric hospital, the now-defunct Holloway Sanatorium in Virginia Water, Surrey. He met a nurse there, Cynthia Billen, whom he married in 1975. They moved to Bryson's hometown of Des Moines, Iowa, in 1975 so Bryson could complete his degree at Drake University. In 1977 they settled in Britain.

He worked as a journalist, first for the Bournemouth Evening Echo, eventually becoming chief copy editor of the business section of The Times and deputy national news editor of the business section of The Independent.

The Brysons moved around the UK, living in Virginia Water (Surrey), Purewell (Dorset), Burton (Dorset), Kirkby Malham (North Yorkshire, in the 1980s and '90s), and the Old Rectory in Wramplingham, Norfolk (2003–2013). They currently live in rural Hampshire and maintain a small flat in South Kensington, London. From 1995 to 2003 they lived in Hanover, New Hampshire.

Although able to apply for British citizenship, Bryson said in 2010 that he had declined a citizenship test, declaring himself "too cowardly" to take it. However, in 2014, he said that he was preparing to take it and in the prologue to his 2015 book The Road to Little Dribbling: More Notes From a Small Island  he describes doing so, in Eastleigh. His citizenship ceremony took place in Winchester and he now holds dual citizenship.

Writings
While living in the US in the 1990s Bryson wrote a column for a British newspaper for several years, reflecting on humorous aspects of his repatriation in the United States. These columns were selected and adapted to become his book I'm a Stranger Here Myself, alternatively titled Notes from a Big Country in Britain, Canada, and Australia. During his time in the US, Bryson decided to walk the Appalachian Trail with his friend Stephen Katz (a pseudonym), about which he wrote the book A Walk in the Woods. In the 2015 film adaptation of A Walk in the Woods, Bryson is portrayed by Academy Award winner Robert Redford, and Katz by Nick Nolte.

In 2003, in conjunction with World Book Day, British voters chose Bryson's book Notes from a Small Island as that which best summed up British identity and the state of the nation. Also in 2003, he was appointed a Commissioner for English Heritage.

His popular science book, the 500-page A Short History of Nearly Everything, explores not only the histories and current statuses of the sciences, but also their humble and often humorous beginnings. Although one "top scientist" is alleged to have jokingly described the book as "annoyingly free of mistakes," Bryson himself makes no such claim, and a list of some of its reported errors is available online.

In November 2006, Bryson interviewed then British prime minister Tony Blair on the state of science and education.

Bryson also wrote two popular works on the history of the English language, The Mother Tongue and Made in America—and, more recently, an update of his guide to usage, Bryson's Dictionary of Troublesome Words (first published as The Penguin Dictionary of Troublesome Words in 1983).

He also released a podcast, Bill Bryson's Appliance of Science, in 2017.

Litigation 
In 2012 Bryson sued his agent, Jed Mattes Inc., in New York County Supreme Court, claiming it had "failed to perform some of the most fundamental duties of an agent." The case was settled out of court, with part of the settlement being that Bryson may not discuss it.

In 2013 Bryson claimed copyright on an interview he had given nearly 20 years previously, after the interviewer republished it as an 8000-word e-book. Amazon removed the e-book from publication.

Awards, positions and honours

Chancellorship 
In 2005, Bryson was appointed chancellor of Durham University, succeeding the late Sir Peter Ustinov, and became more active with student activities than is common for holders of that post, appearing in a Durham student film and promoting litter-collection in the city. He had praised Durham as "a perfect little city" in Notes from a Small Island. In October 2010, it was announced that Bryson would step down at the end of 2011.

Environmental protection 
In May 2007, he became the president of the Campaign to Protect Rural England. His first focus in this role was the establishment of an anti-littering campaign across England. He discussed the future of the countryside with Richard Mabey, Sue Clifford, Nicholas Crane, and Richard Girling at CPRE's Volunteer Conference in November 2007. In 2011, Bryson won the Golden Eagle Award from the Outdoor Writers and Photographers Guild.

Scientific and other writings 
Bryson has received numerous awards for his ability to communicate science with passion and enthusiasm. In 2004, he won the Aventis Prize for best general science book that year, with A Short History of Nearly Everything. In 2005, the book won the European Union's Descartes Prize for science communication. In 2005, he received the President's Award from the Royal Society of Chemistry for advancing the cause of the chemical sciences. In 2007, he won the Bradford Washburn Award, from the Museum of Science in Boston, Massachusetts, for contributions to the popularization of science. In 2012, he received the Kenneth B. Myer Award, from the Florey Institute of Neuroscience, in Melbourne, Australia.

With the Royal Society of Chemistry, the Bill Bryson Prize for Science Communication was established in 2005. The competition engages students from around the world in explaining science to non-experts. As part of its 350th anniversary celebrations in 2010 the Royal Society commissioned Bryson to edit a collection of essays by scientists and science writers about the history of science and the Royal Society over the previous three and a half centuries entitled Seeing Further.

He was made an honorary Officer of the Order of the British Empire (OBE) for his contribution to literature on 13 December 2006. In 2007, he was awarded the James Joyce Award by the Literary and Historical Society of University College Dublin. After he received British citizenship, his OBE was made substantive.

On 22 November 2012, Durham University officially renamed the Main Library the Bill Bryson Library for his contributions as the university's 11th chancellor (2005–2011). The library also has a cafe named after Bryson's book Notes from a Small Island.

Bryson was elected an Honorary Fellow of the Royal Society (FRS) in 2013, becoming the first non-Briton to receive this honour. His biography at the Society reads:
Bill Bryson is a popular author who is driven by a deep curiosity for the world we live in. Bill's books and lectures demonstrate an abiding love for science and an appreciation for its social importance. His international bestseller, A Short History of Nearly Everything (2003), is widely acclaimed for its accessible communication of science and has since been adapted for children.

Education 
In January 2007, Bryson was the Schwartz Visiting Fellow at the Pomfret School in Connecticut.

Honorary doctorates

Honorary Doctorate, The Open University, 2002
Honorary Doctor of Civil Law, Durham University, 2004
Honorary Doctorate, Bournemouth University, 2005
Honorary Doctorate, University of St Andrews, 2005
DLitt, University of Leeds, 2005
Honorary Doctorate, University of Leicester, 2009
Doctor of Humane Letters, Drake University, 2009
Honorary Doctorate, King's College London, 13 November 2012
Honorary Doctorate, University of Westminster, 2015
Honorary Doctor of Humane Letters, University of Iowa, May 2016
Honorary Doctorate for services to literature, University of Winchester, October 2016

Bibliography
Bryson has written the following books:

References

External links

 Works at Open Library
 

1951 births
20th-century American non-fiction writers
20th-century British non-fiction writers
21st-century American non-fiction writers
21st-century British non-fiction writers
American agnostics
American emigrants to England
American humorists
American male non-fiction writers
American memoirists
American non-fiction outdoors writers
American people of Irish descent
American science writers
American travel writers
Audiobook narrators
British agnostics
British Book Award winners
British humorists
British male non-fiction writers
British memoirists
British non-fiction outdoors writers
British science writers
British travel writers
Chancellors of Durham University
Drake University alumni
Hikers
Honorary Fellows of the Royal Society
Living people
Officers of the Order of the British Empire
People from Hanover, New Hampshire
The Times people
Writers from Des Moines, Iowa
20th-century American male writers
21st-century American male writers